Brianna Caitlin Hildebrand (born August 14, 1996) is an American actress. She is best known for appearing as Negasonic Teenage Warhead in the films Deadpool (2016) and Deadpool 2 (2018). She is also known for appearing in the web series Annie Undocumented, and as the character Aurora in the Netflix show Lucifer. She also portrayed Elodie Davis in the show Trinkets.

Career 
Hildebrand appeared in the web series Annie Undocumented, named best web series at the 2014 New York TV Festival. The series was created by Daniel Hsia, Elaine Low and Brian Yang.

Hildebrand was cast as the superhero Negasonic Teenage Warhead in the film Deadpool  on March 30, 2015. The film was shot in Vancouver in April 2015, and released on February 12, 2016. She reprised the role in the sequel in 2018, during which her character was confirmed to be the first openly gay superhero in the X-Men cinematic universe. She was also cast as Sasha in First Girl I Loved, starring opposite Dylan Gelula and Mateo Arias.

In July 2017, Hildebrand was added to the main cast for season two of The Exorcist.
In December 2020, Hildebrand was added to the cast of Lucifer for its final season.

Personal life
Hildebrand was born in College Station, Texas. Regarding her sexuality, Hildebrand has said, "I learned pretty early on that I like both boys and girls [..] I am lucky to say now that it is not frightening for me living in LA to be gay. Even when I was in Texas, I wasn’t afraid. I was kind of out in high school. I just could never decide on what label. I am glad that I am public about it and I think I should be."

Filmography

Film

Television

Web series

Awards and nominations

References

External links 
 

1996 births
21st-century American actresses
Actresses from Texas
American film actresses
American web series actresses
American LGBT actors
LGBT actresses
LGBT people from Texas
Living people
People from College Station, Texas
21st-century LGBT people